Victor Rangel-Ribeiro (born 1925) is an Indian writer, former journalist, music conductor and editor. His is most noted as the author of Tivolem (1998), whose writing was funded by a New York Foundation for the Arts Fiction Fellowship (awarded 1991), and which was awarded the Milkweed National Fiction Prize and shortlisted for the Crossword Book Award.

Biography
Born in Goa, counting Konkani, Portuguese, and English as his three mother tongues, he moved to Mumbai in 1939 and took his BA from St. Xavier's College, Mumbai in 1945. After a short spell teaching at high school, he moved into journalism. The 1940s already saw a number of his English-language short stories appearing in British Indian publications.

Work, employment
After Indian independence in 1947, Rangel-Ribeiro became assistant editor and music critic of the National Standard, Sunday editor for the Calcutta edition of the Times of India (1953), and a literary editor for The Illustrated Weekly. He was the first Indian to be appointed Copy Chief at the advertising giant J Walter Thompson's Bombay office, but migrated to the US just months later.

In 1956 emigrated to the United States, along with his wife, Lea, and worked part-time as a music critic for the New York Times 
From 1964 to 1973 he ran a music antiquariat in New York City, became director of the New York Beethoven Society (overseeing its entry into the Lincoln Center for the Performing Arts).

Education
In 1983 he took an MA from Teachers College, Columbia University, taught for a time in private and public schools, and then became involved in coordinating adult literacy teaching.

Personal life
He and his  musician-educationist wife Lea (d.2011) have two children.

Works

This is a partial bibliography.

Non-fiction
 Souza: The Artist, His Loves and His Times (Goa: Goa Publications Pvt. Ltd., 2019) – biography of F. N. Souza

Novels
 Tivolem (Minneapolis: Milkweed, 1998)

Short stories
 'The Miscreant', The Iowa Review 20.2 (1990): 52–65,
 'Madonna of the Raindrops' and 'Day of the Baptist', Literary Review, 39.4 (1998)
 'Senhor Eusebio Builds his Dream House' and 'Angel Wings', in Ferry Crossing: Short Stories from Goa, ed. by Manohar Shetty (New Delhi: Penguin, 1998)
 Loving Ayesha and Other Tales from Near and Far (2002)
 'Keeping in Touch', The Little Magazine, 2.4,
 'The Miscreant', Selected Stories 1949-2016 (2017)

Music
 Baroque Music, a Practical Guide for the Performer (New York: Schirmer, 1981)
 Victor Rangel-Ribeiro and Robert Markel. Chamber Music: An International Guide to Works and Their Instrumentation (New York: Facts on File, 1993)
 Damoreau, Laure-Cinthie, Classic Bel Canto Technique, trans. by Victor Rangel-Ribeiro (Mineola: Dover, 1997) 
 Chausson, Ernest, Selected Songs for Voice and Piano, trans. by Victor Rangel-Ribeiro (Mineola: Dover, 1998) 
 Chausson, Ernest, Concerto in D for Piano, Violin, and String Quartet, Op. 21 in Full Score, ed. by Victor Rangel-Ribeiro (Minneola: Dover, 1999) 
 Saint-Saens, Camille, Danse Macabre and Other Works for Piano Solo', ed. by Victor Rangel-Ribeiro (Mineola: Dover, 1999) 
 Satie, Erik, Parade and Other Works for Piano Four Hands, ed. by Victor Rangel-Ribeiro (Mineola: Dover, 1999) 
 Satie, Erik, Parade in Full Score'', ed. by Victor Rangel-Ribeiro (Mineola: Dover, 2000)

References

External links
 
 

20th-century Indian novelists
Novelists from Goa
Indian male novelists
Indian male short story writers
1925 births
Living people
20th-century Indian short story writers
Teachers College, Columbia University alumni
20th-century Indian male writers